Dictyna palmgreni is a spider species found in Finland and Russia.

See also 
 List of Dictynidae species

References

External links 

Dictynidae
Spiders of Russia
Spiders described in 2011
Spiders of Europe